Nathan Philemon Bryan (April 23, 1872 – August 8, 1935) was a United States senator from Florida and a United States circuit judge of the United States Court of Appeals for the Fifth Circuit.

Education and career

Born on April 23, 1872, in Fort Mason, Orange County (now Lake County), Florida, Bryan attended the common schools. He received an Artium Baccalaureus degree in 1893 from Emory College and a Bachelor of Laws in 1895 from Washington and Lee University School of Law. He was admitted to the bar and entered private practice in Jacksonville, Florida from 1893 to 1911. He was Chairman of the Board of Control of the Florida State institutions of higher education from 1905 to 1909.

Congressional service

Bryan was appointed by the Governor of Florida on February 22, 1911, the Florida State Legislature having failed to elect, and subsequently elected as a Democrat to the United States Senate and served from March 4, 1911, to March 3, 1917. He was an unsuccessful candidate for renomination in 1916. He was Chairman of the Committee on Claims for the 63rd and 64th United States Congresses. He returned to private practice in Jacksonville from 1917 to 1920. He declined appointment as Governor General of the Philippine Islands by President Wilson in 1917. He was a trustee of Emory University.

Federal judicial service

Bryan was nominated by President Woodrow Wilson on April 23, 1920, to a seat on the United States Court of Appeals for the Fifth Circuit vacated by Judge R. L. Batts. He was confirmed by the United States Senate on April 23, 1920, and received his commission the same day. He was a member of the Conference of Senior Circuit Judges (now the Judicial Conference of the United States) from 1930 to 1934. His service terminated on August 8, 1935, due to his death in Jacksonville. He was interred in Evergreen Cemetery in Jacksonville.

Family

Bryan's brother was William James Bryan, also a United States senator from Florida.

References

Sources

 
 

1872 births
1935 deaths
People from Lake County, Florida
Florida Democrats
Emory University alumni
Washington and Lee University School of Law alumni
Democratic Party United States senators from Florida
Judges of the United States Court of Appeals for the Fifth Circuit
United States court of appeals judges appointed by Woodrow Wilson
20th-century American judges